Medicago is a genus of flowering plants, commonly known as medick or burclover, in the legume family (Fabaceae). It contains at least 87 species and is distributed mainly around the Mediterranean basin. The best-known member of the genus is alfalfa (M. sativa), an important forage crop, and the genus name is based on the Latin name for that plant, from  Median (grass). Most members of the genus are low, creeping herbs, resembling clover, but with burs (hence the common name). However, alfalfa grows to a height of 1 meter, and tree medick (M. arborea) is a shrub. Members of the genus are known to produce bioactive compounds such as medicarpin (a flavonoid) and medicagenic acid (a triterpenoid saponin). Chromosome numbers in Medicago range from 2n = 14 to 48.

The species Medicago truncatula is a model legume due to its relatively small stature, small genome (450–500 Mbp), short generation time (about 3 months), and ability to reproduce both by outcrossing and selfing.

Comprehensive descriptions of the genus are Lesinš and Lesinš 1979 and Small and Jomphe 1989. Major collections are SARDI (Australia), USDA-GRIN (United States), ICARDA (Syria), and INRA (France).

Evolution
Medicago diverged from Glycine (soybean) about 53–55 million years ago (in the early Eocene), from Lotus (deervetch) 49–51 million years ago (also in the Eocene), and from Trigonella 10–22 million years ago (in the Miocene).

Ecological interactions with other organisms

Symbiosis with nitrogen-fixing rhizobia

Béna et al. (2005) constructed a molecular phylogeny of 23 Sinorhizobium strains and tested the symbiotic ability of six strains with 35 Medicago species. Comparison of these phylogenies indicates many transitions in the compatibility of the association over evolutionary time. Furthermore, they propose that the geographical distribution of strains limits the distribution of particular Medicago species.

Agricultural uses
Other than alfalfa, several of the creeping members of the family (such as Medicago lupulina and Medicago truncatula) have been used as forage crops.

Insect herbivores
Medicago species are used as food plants by the larvae of some Lepidoptera species including the common swift, flame, latticed heath, lime-speck pug, nutmeg, setaceous Hebrew character, and turnip moths and case-bearers of the genus Coleophora, including C. frischella (recorded on M. sativa) and C. fuscociliella (feeds exclusively on Medicago spp.).

Species
This list is compiled from:

Section Buceras

Subsection Deflexae
 Medicago retrorsa (Boiss.) E. Small

Subsection Erectae
 Medicago arenicola (Huber-Mor.) E. Small
 Medicago astroites (Fisch. & Mey.) Trautv.
 Medicago carica (Huber-Mor.) E. Small
 Medicago crassipes (Boiss.) E. Small
 Medicago fischeriana (Ser.) Trautv.
 Medicago halophila (Boiss.) E. Small
 Medicago heldreichii (Boiss.) E. Small
 Medicago medicaginoides (Retz.) E. Small
 Medicago monantha (C. A. Meyer) Trautv.
 Medicago orthoceras (Kar. & Kir.) Trautv.
 Medicago pamphylica (Huber-Mor. & Sirjaev) E. Small
 Medicago persica (Boiss.) E. Small
 Medicago phrygia (Boiss. & Bal.) E. Small
 Medicago polyceratia (L.) Trautv.
 Medicago rigida (Boiss. & Bal.) E. Small

Subsection Isthmocarpae
 Medicago rhytidiocarpa (Boiss. & Bal.) E. Small
 Medicago isthmocarpa (Boiss. & Bal.) E. Small

Subsection Reflexae
 Medicago monspeliaca (L.) Trautv.

Section Carstiensae
 Medicago carstiensis Wulf.

Section Dendrotelis
 Medicago arborea L.
 Medicago citrina (Font Quer) Greuter
 Medicago strasseri Greuter, Matthas & Risse

Section Geocarpa
 Medicago hypogaea E. Small

Section Heynianae
 Medicago heyniana Greuter

Section Hymenocarpos
 Medicago radiata L.

Section Lunatae
 Medicago biflora (Griseb.) E. Small
 Medicago brachycarpa M. Bieb.
 Medicago huberi E. Small
 Medicago rostrata (Boiss. & Bal.) E. Small

Section Lupularia
 Medicago lupulina L.
 Medicago secundiflora Durieu

Section Medicago
 Medicago cancellata M. Bieb.
 Medicago daghestanica Rupr.
 Medicago hybrida (Pourr.) Trautv.
 Medicago marina L.
 Medicago papillosa Boiss.
 M. p. macrocarpa
 M. p. papillosa
 Medicago pironae Vis.
 Medicago prostrata Jacq.
 M. p. prostrata
 M. p. pseudorupestris
 Medicago rhodopea Velen.
 Medicago rupestris M. Bieb
 Medicago sativa L. (alfalfa)
 M. s. caerulea
 M. s. falcata (Medicago falcata)
 M. s. f. var. falcata
 M. s. f. var. viscosa
 M. s. glomerata
 M. s. sativa
* Medicago saxatilis M. Bieb
 Medicago suffruticosa Ramond ex DC.
M. s. leiocarpa
M. s. suffruticosa

Section Orbiculares
 Medicago orbicularis (L.) Bart.

Section Platycarpae
 Medicago archiducis-nicolai Sirjaev
 Medicago cretacea M. Bieb.
 Medicago edgeworthii Sirjaev
 Medicago ovalis (Boiss.) Sirjaev
 Medicago playtcarpa (L.) Trautv.
 Medicago plicata (Boiss.) Sirjaev
 Medicago popovii (E. Kor.) Sirjaev
 Medicago ruthenica (L.) Ledebour

Subsection Rotatae
 Medicago blancheana Boiss.
 Medicago noeana Boiss.
 Medicago rugosa Desr.
 Medicago rotata Boiss.
 Medicago scutellata (L.) Miller
 Medicago shepardii Post

Section Spirocarpos

Subsection Intertextae
 Medicago ciliaris (L.) Krocker
 Medicago granadensis Willd.
 Medicago intertexta (L.) Miller
 Medicago muricoleptis Tin.

Subsection Leptospireae
 Medicago arabica (L.) Huds.
 Medicago coronata (L.) Bart.
 Medicago disciformis DC.
 Medicago laciniata (L.) Miller
 Medicago lanigera Winkl. & Fedtsch.
 Medicago laxispira Heyn
 Medicago minima (L.) Bart.
 Medicago polymorpha L.
 Medicago praecox DC.
 Medicago sauvagei Nègre
 Medicago tenoreana Ser.

Subsection Pachyspireae
 Medicago constricta Durieu
 Medicago doliata Carmign.
 Medicago italica (Miller) Fiori
 Medicago lesinsii E. Small
 Medicago littoralis Rohde ex Lois.
 Medicago murex Willd.
 Medicago rigidula (L.) All.
 Medicago rigiduloides E. Small
 Medicago sinskiae Uljanova
 Medicago soleirolii Duby
 Medicago sphaerocarpos Bertol.
 Medicago syriaca E. Small
 Medicago truncatula Gaertn.
 Medicago turbinata (L.) All.

Species names with uncertain taxonomic status
The status of the following species is unresolved:

 Medicago agropyretorum Vassilcz.
 Medicago alatavica Vassilcz.

 Medicago caucasica Vassilcz.
 Medicago cyrenaea Maire & Weiller
 Medicago difalcata Sinskaya

 Medicago grossheimii Vassilcz.
 Medicago gunibica Vassilcz.
 Medicago hemicoerulea Sinskaya

 Medicago karatschaica (A. Heller) A. Heller
 Medicago komarovii Vassilcz.

 Medicago meyeri Gruner

 Medicago polychroa Grossh.

 Medicago schischkinii Sumnev.
 Medicago talyschensis Latsch.

 Medicago transoxana Vassilcz.

 Medicago tunetana (Murb.) A.W. Hill
 Medicago vardanis' Vassilcz.
 Medicago virescens Grossh.

Recent molecular phylogenic analyses of Medicago'' indicate that the sections and subsections defined by Small & Jomphe, as outlined above, are generally polyphyletic. However, with minor revisions sections and subsections could be rendered monophyletic.

Notes

References

 
Plant models
Fabaceae genera